Catherine Frot (born 1 May 1956) is a French actress. A 10-time César Award nominee, she won the awards for Best Actress
for Marguerite (2015) and Best Supporting Actress for Family Resemblances (1996). Her other films include Le Dîner de Cons (1998), La Dilettante (1999), and Haute Cuisine (2012).

Early life
Frot was born in Paris, France, the daughter of an engineer and a mathematics teacher. Her younger sister, Dominique, is also an actress. Catherine demonstrated comic talent at an early age, and enrolled in the Versailles conservatory when she was 14, and was still in school. In 1974, she began her education at the  school, and afterwards took up full-time studies at the conservatory.

Career
In 1975, Frot appeared at the Festival d'Avignon with the Compagnie du Chapeau Rouge (Red Hat Company), which she founded with the help of others. From then on, she put all her energy into theatre performances in roles such as the Présidente de Tourvel in the play Les Liaisons dangereuses in 1987. She performed in a number of classical plays such as La Cerisaie, directed by Peter Brook in 1982, and La Mouette directed by Pierre Pradinas in 1985. 

In films, Frot won the César Award for Best Actress in a Supporting Role in 1996, for playing Yolande, the sweet silly wife of a provincial bully, in Cédric Klapisch's Un air de famille, and was funny and moving as a wealthy, rebellious nuisance in La Dilettante (1999). In 7 ans de mariage, she played a prudish banker, wife, and mother, who is drawn by her bored, sexually frustrated husband into the world of Parisian clubs échangistes ("wife-swapping clubs"). She is an officer of the Ordre national du Mérite.

Filmography

References

External links

 
  Portrait of Catherine Frot

1956 births
Living people
French film actresses
French stage actresses
French television actresses
Best Supporting Actress César Award winners
20th-century French actresses
21st-century French actresses
Officers of the Ordre national du Mérite
Chevaliers of the Ordre des Arts et des Lettres
Chevaliers of the Légion d'honneur
French National Academy of Dramatic Arts alumni
Actresses from Paris
Best Actress Lumières Award winners
Best Actress César Award winners